Kara Young is an American model and entrepreneur. As a model she represented several cosmetics companies and appeared three times on the cover of Vogue, Playboy (Germany) and was an entertainment news correspondent for Fox News Channel, as well as co-founding a hair product company and salon.

Early life

Kara was born on August 23, 1969 in San Francisco, CA to Belizean Parents  Marie and Thomas Young.  Her mother is of Belizean creole descent, her father is of Jewish and Scottish descent.

Career
According to Young's company web site, between 1988 and 1998 she appeared in advertising campaigns for Revlon, L'Oreal, Clairol, Maybelline, as well as Victoria's Secret and was photographed by Richard Avedon for Revlon's "Most Unforgettable Women" campaign. Young was an A-list model and was profiled in the 1990 article "The New Top Models". She was a cover girl for Vogue in both 1988 and 1989, but is known best for her modeling with Victoria's Secret. She appeared on the covers of Vogue, Elle and Glamour magazine during the early 1990s. She later became an entertainment news correspondent for Fox News Channel. Young retired from modeling and became the co-founder of  Hair Rules, a hair care product line and NYC salon.

Personal
Young was married to photographer Sante D'Orazio in the mid-1990s. In the late 1990s, Young was noticed by Donald Trump at a party in the Hamptons. He pursued her, and they began dating for approximately two years beginning around 1997. In 2005, she married Peter Georgiopoulos, the founder of the General Maritime shipping company, who was a billionaire at the time, but General Maritime went bankrupt in 2011. Peter Georgiopoulos resigned as chairman and a director of NYSE-listed Genco Shipping & Trading Limited. No reason was given for his departure. As part of the separation and release agreements signed today with Genco, Georgiopoulos will receive a $500,000 severance payment and full vesting of his unvested equity awards. This will comprise grants of 68,581 restricted Genco shares and warrants exercisable for approximately 213,937 shares of the company’s common stock with an exercise price per share ranging from $259.10 to $341.90. Young lives in New York City with Georgiopoulos and their two children. She is a member of the board of directors for Action Against Hunger.

References

Living people
Actresses from San Francisco
Female models from California
Year of birth missing (living people)
21st-century American women
Date of birth missing (living people)